Mathema is a surname. Notable people with the surname include:

Cain Mathema (born 1947), Zimbabwean politician 
Dharma Bhakta Mathema (1909–1941), Nepali freedom fighter
Koili Devi Mathema ( 1929–2007), Nepali lyricist, singer, and composer